Phoma glomerata is a fungus pathogen with several hosts. It mainly spoils wool because it badly alters the fibers.

See also 
 List of mango diseases
 List of hemp diseases
 List of elm diseases
 List of wheat diseases

References

External links 
 Index Fungorum
 USDA ARS Fungal Database

Fungal plant pathogens and diseases
Fungal tree pathogens and diseases
Mango tree diseases
Wheat diseases
glomerata
Fungi described in 1936